Aircraft carriers have their origins during the days of World War I. The earliest experiments consisted of fitting temporary "flying off" platforms to the gun turrets of the warships of several nations, notably the United States and the United Kingdom. The first ship to be modified with a permanent flight deck was the battlecruiser , which initially had a single flying-off deck forward of the original superstructure. Subsequently, she was modified with a separate "landing on" deck aft and later with a full flush deck. Other ships, often liners, were modified to have full flush flight decks,  being the first to have such modification begun. Those first faltering steps gave little indication of just how important the aircraft carrier was to prove to be. During the inter-war years (between the World Wars), Japan, the United Kingdom and the United States built up significant carrier fleets so that by the beginning of World War II, they had 18 carriers between them. The 1940 Battle of Taranto and 1941 Attack on Pearl Harbor in retrospect showed the world that the aircraft carrier was to be the most important ship in the modern fleet. Today, aircraft carriers are the capital ships of the navies they serve in, and in the case of modern US "supercarriers", they embark an air group that is effectively a small air force.

This timeline is an attempt to provide a unified chronology of key dates in carrier service. Aircraft carriers often serve their navies for many decades and this chronology enables the reader to track the progress of the carrier as it has developed alongside the evolution of aircraft for nearly a hundred years.

Pre-carrier history

1849
 On 12 July 1849, the Austrian Navy ship  was used for launching incendiary balloons. A number of small Montgolfiere hot air ballons were launched with the intention of dropping bombs on Venice. Although the attempt largely failed due to contrary winds which drove the balloons back over the ship, one bomb did land on the city.

1907
 The British Admiralty, according to legend, politely refused the Wright brothers' offer to sell them one or more aircraft, by saying that they could see no place for aviation in naval circles.

1910
 14 November – First successful launch of an aircraft from a ship, using a temporary wooden platform for a flight deck on the stationary cruiser .

1911
 18 January – First deck landing, using a temporary wooden platform on the at anchor ; first use of a tailhook-arrested landing system.

1912
 10 January – First launch of an aircraft from a British ship, Charles Samson flies off a platform fixed to the front of the stationary battleship .
 2 May – First recorded flight from a moving ship, Samson flies off , steaming at 10.5 knots. Then in June, Samson flies off .

World War I

1914
 28 June – Assassination of Archduke Franz Ferdinand; World War I begins.
 31 October – First aircraft carrying ship to be sunk in action, (former cruiser) seaplane carrier  sunk by U-27.
 25 December – Attack on Cuxhaven, the first attack from the sea upon a land target using aircraft (seaplanes carried to within range to bomb the Zeppelin sheds at Cuxhaven).

1915
 12 August – First attack using an air-launched torpedo, from a Short Type 184 seaplane flown by Flight Commander Charles H. K. Edmonds from seaplane carrier .
 5 November – First catapult launch of an aircraft from a ship, .

1916
 31 May – First use of an aeroplane during a battle at sea, the Battle of Jutland.
 August – Incomplete Italian liner Conte Rosso purchased by the Royal Navy for completion and conversion to an aircraft carrier, .

1917
 February – Incomplete large light cruiser  has its forward gun replaced with a flying-off deck.

 2 August – First aircraft landing aboard a moving ship, HMS Furious; this ship was subsequently modified with a stern-mounted landing deck in late 1917.
 21 August – First air-to-air kill from a ship-launched aircraft, Zeppelin L23 shot down by a Sopwith Pup from cruiser .
 2 December – HMS Argus launched.

1918
 15 January –  laid down; Hermes was the first ship specifically designed to be built as an aircraft carrier and the first carrier to feature an island superstructure.
 28 February – Incomplete Chilean battleship Almirante Cochrane purchased by the Royal Navy to be completed as the carrier .
 8 June – HMS Eagle launched.
 9 July – First strike by aircraft launched from a carrier, the Tondern raid, an attack by British aircraft from Furious against a German airship base in northern Germany.
 14 September – HMS Argus commissioned.
 11 November – Armistice signed, signalling the end of WWI.

Between the wars
1919
 11 July –  authorised to be converted to a carrier.
 11 September – HMS Hermes launched.
 16 December –  laid down, possibly as the tanker Hiryu.

1920–1929
1920

 21 April – USS Jupiter renamed .
 1 November – U.S. Navy sinks  during an exercise testing aerial bombardment.
 6 December –  laid down as battlecruiser.

1921
 13 November – Hōshō launched.

1922
 6 February – Washington Naval Treaty limiting naval forces signed.
 HMS Furious flush-deck conversion begun.
 Spanish seaplane carrier  is commissioned in the Spanish Navy.
 20 March – USS Langley commissioned.
 1 July – Battlecruisers  and  reclassified to be completed as carriers.
 27 December – Hōshō commissioned.

1923

 July – HMS Hermes commissioned
 August – Conversion of the French   to an aircraft carrier started.
  and Akagi conversions from battlecruiser to aircraft carrier begun.

1924
 26 February – HMS Eagle commissioned.
 June – Light cruiser  carrier conversion started.

1925

 Light cruiser  carrier conversion started.
 7 April – USS Saratoga launched.
 22 April – Akagi launched.
 1 July – First night deck landing made by F/Lt Boyce flying a Blackburn Dart onto HMS Furious
 September – HMS Furious re-enters service with flush flight deck.
 3 October – USS Lexington launched.

1926
 6 May – First night deck landing, aboard .

1927
 25 March – Akagi commissioned
 May – Béarn commissioned.
 16 November – USS Saratoga commissioned.
 14 December – USS Lexington commissioned.

1928

 5 May – HMS Courageous commissioned as a carrier; first carrier to be fitted with transverse arrestor gear (friction-based).
 31 March – Kaga commissioned.

1929
 26 November –  laid down.

1930–1939
1930
 10 March – HMS Glorious recommissioned as an aircraft carrier.
 March – HMS Argus placed in reserve.

1931
 2 January – First carrier fitted with hydraulic arresting gear, HMS Courageous.
 2 April – Ryūjō launched.
 26 September –  laid down.

1933

 25 February – USS Ranger launched.
 9 May – Ryūjō commissioned.

1934

 21 May –  laid down.
 4 June – USS Ranger commissioned.
 16 July –  laid down.
 20 November –  laid down.

1935
 9 September – First landing of a rotary winged aircraft aboard a carrier – a Cierva autogyro onto HMS Furious
 16 September –  laid down.
 21 December – Sōryū launched.

1936
 15 January – Japan exits the Washington Naval Treaty.
 1 April –  laid down.
 4 April – USS Yorktown launched.
 8 July –  laid down.
 3 October – USS Enterprise launched.
 25 October – USS Langley taken in hand for conversion to a seaplane tender.
 28 December – Flugzeugträger A (Graf Zeppelin) laid down.

1937

 29 January – Sōryū commissioned.
 26 February – USS Langley recommissioned as a seaplane tender.
 13 April – HMS Ark Royal launched.
 27 April –  laid down.
 4 May –  laid down.
 17 June –  laid down.
 30 September – USS Yorktown commissioned.
 10 November –  laid down.
 16 November – Hiryū launched.
 12 December –  laid down.

1938

 Takasaki carrier conversion started.
 Flugzeugträger B laid down.
 12 May – USS Enterprise commissioned.
 25 May –  laid down.
 8 December – Graf Zeppelin launched.
 16 December – HMS Ark Royal commissioned; first carrier with deck armour.

1939

 21 February –  laid down.
 4 April – USS Wasp launched.
 5 April – HMS Illustrious launched.
 1 June – Shōkaku launched.
 26 June –  laid down.
 5 July – Hiryū commissioned.
 17 August – HMS Formidable launched.

World War II

1939

 1 September – Germany invades Poland, World War II begins.
 14 September – HMS Victorious launched.
 17 September – HMS Courageous sunk in action.
 25 September –  laid down.
 26 September – First Allied air victory in WWII, a Dornier Do 18 shot down by Blackburn Skua of 803 Squadron from HMS Ark Royal.
 27 November – Zuikaku launched.
 3 November –  laid down.

1940
 Conversion of Izumo Maru to carrier started, renamed Hiyō.
 Kashiwara Maru carrier conversion started, renamed Jun'yō.
 HMS Argus recommissioned as training and transport carrier.
 28 February – German Flugzeugträger B cancelled while under construction.
 26 March – HMS Indomitable launched.
 25 April – USS Wasp commissioned.
 May – Graf Zeppelin construction temporarily suspended.
 25 May – HMS Illustrious commissioned; first fully armoured carrier.
 June – Béarn interned at Martinique.
 18 June – HMS Glorious sunk in action.
 21 June – Attack on Scharnhorst, first ever torpedo attack by aircraft on a capital ship at sea.
 25 June – France falls to Germany.
 11 November – Battle of Taranto is the first carrier-based torpedo-bomber attack.
 24 November – HMS Formidable commissioned.
 14 December – USS Hornet launched.
 27 December – conversion of Takasaki completed, commissioned as Zuihō.

1941
 Submarine tender Tsurugisaki carrier conversion started.
 Italian passenger liner Roma carrier conversion started, renamed Aquila
 28 April –  laid down.
 May – Incomplete passenger liners Kasuga Maru, Yawata Maru and Nitta Maru carrier conversions started.
 1 May –  laid down as light cruiser .
Bismarck is later sunk by battleships.
 15 May – HMS Victorious commissioned.
 24 June – Hiyō launched.
 26 June – Junyō launched.

 10 July – Taihō laid down.
 15 July –  laid down.
 8 August – Shōkaku commissioned.
 2 September – Kasuga Maru carrier conversion completed.
 15 September –  laid down; Kasuga Maru commissioned as Taiyō
 25 September – Zuikaku commissioned.
 10 October – HMS Indomitable commissioned.
 20 October – USS Hornet commissioned.
 13 November – HMS Ark Royal sunk in action.

 20 November – HMS Unicorn launched.
 1 December – ,  laid down.
 7 December – Japan attacks Pearl Harbor naval base in Hawaii and in Philippines; as a result United States enters World War II.
 20 December – Submarine tender Taigei carrier conversion started.

1942
 26 January – Tsurugisaki carrier conversion completed, commissioned as Shōhō.
 February –  carrier conversion started by Japan.
 16 February – Light cruisers  and  reclassified for completion as carriers.
 27 February – USS Langley sunk in action.
 16 March –  laid down as light cruiser.
 18 March –  laid down.

 27 March – Light cruisers  and  reclassified for completion as carriers; Huntington renamed .
 31 March – USS Tallahassee renamed , USS New Haven renamed , USS Dayton renamed .
 9 April – HMS Hermes sunk in action.
 11 April – Originally intended as light cruiser ,  laid down.
 May – Béarn demilitarised; Graf Zeppelin construction resumed
 4 May – Battle of the Coral Sea commences – first carrier-to-carrier naval engagement in history, and first naval engagement where neither fleet directly fired upon nor came within sight of the other fleet.
 5 May – Jun'yō commissioned.
 7 May – Shōhō sunk in action.

 8 May – USS Lexington sunk in action; Battle of the Coral Sea ends.
 31 May – Yawata Maru carrier conversion completed, commissioned as Unyō.
 June – Incomplete Yamato-class battleship Shinano carrier conversion started.
 1 June –  laid down, and  laid down.
 2 June – USS Wilmington re-designated for completion as carrier.
 4 June – Battle of Midway commenced, generally considered to be the most important naval battle in the Pacific during World War II; Akagi, Kaga, Sōryū severely damaged in action, with Kaga and Sōryū subsequently scuttled.
 5 June – Hiryū sunk in action, Akagi scuttled.
 7 June – USS Yorktown sunk in action; Battle of Midway ended.
 16 June – USS Cabot renamed .
 23 June – USS Wilmington renamed .

 31 July – Hiyō commissioned; USS Essex launched.
 1 August –  laid down.
 3 August –  laid down.
 11 August – HMS Eagle sunk in action.
 22 August – USS Independence launched.
 24 August – Ryūjō sunk in action.
 27 August –  laid down.
 31 August –  laid down; Kasuga Maru reclassified as warship;

 15 September – USS Wasp sunk in action.
 26 September – USS Bon Homme Richard renamed ; USS Lexington launched.
 1 October –  laid down.
 18 October – USS Princeton launched.
 24 October –  laid down.
 26 October –  laid down.
 27 October – USS Hornet sunk in action.
 8 November –  laid down.
 12 November –  laid down.
 13 November – USS Crown Point renamed , USS Oriskany renamed .

 25 November – Nitta Maru carrier conversion completed, renamed and commissioned as Chūyō.
 28 November – Taigei carrier conversion completed, renamed and commissioned as Ryūhō.
 2 December –  laid down, subsequently renamed HMS Mars.
 3 December –  laid down.
 6 December – USS Belleau Wood launched.
 7 December –  laid down, USS Bunker Hill launched.
 8 December – Katsuragi laid down; HMS Indefatigable launched.
 10 December – HMS Implacable launched; Argentina Maru carrier conversion started.
 12 December –  laid down.
 15 December –  laid down.

 31 December – USS Essex commissioned.

1943
 6 January –  laid down.
 14 January – USS Independence commissioned.
 15 January –  laid down.
 17 January – USS Cowpens launched.
 21 January – USS Yorktown launched.
 22 January – USS Kearsarge renamed .
 26 January – Chitose carrier conversion started;  laid down.
 27 January –  laid down.
 30 January – USS Reprisal renamed ; Graf Zeppelin construction stopped and project cancelled.
 February – SS Scharnhorst acquired to be completed as Shinyo.
 1 February –  and  laid down.
 17 February – USS Lexington commissioned.

 25 February – USS Princeton commissioned.
 28 February – USS Monterey launched.
 March – Chiyoda carrier conversion started.
 12 March – HMS Unicorn commissioned.
 15 March –  and  laid down.
 31 March – USS Belleau Wood commissioned.
 4 April – USS Cabot launched.
 7 April – Taihō launched.
 14 April – Kasagi laid down.
 15 April –  laid down; USS Yorktown commissioned.
 19 April –  laid down.
 26 April – USS Intrepid launched.
 1 May – USS Hancock renamed , USS Ticonderoga renamed .
 3 May –  laid down.
 10 May –  laid down.
 22 May – USS Langley launched.
 24 May – USS Bunker Hill commissioned.
 28 May – USS Cowpens commissioned.
 8 June – Aso laid down.

 17 June – USS Monterey commissioned.
 30 June – Béarn transferred to the Free French forces.
 5 July – Ikoma laid down.
 24 July – USS Cabot commissioned.
 29 July –  laid down.
 1 August – USS Bataan launched.
 16 August – USS Intrepid commissioned.
 17 August – USS Wasp launched.
 30 August – USS Hornet launched.
 31 August – USS Langley commissioned.
 September – Incomplete carrier Aquila taken over by Germany after Italian surrender, but never completed
 13 September –  laid down.
 14 September –  laid down.
 25 September – Unryū launched.
 26 September – USS San Jacinto launched.
 30 September – HMS Colossus launched.
 12 October –  laid down.
 14 October – USS Franklin launched.
 15 October – Amagi launched.
 18 October –  laid down.
 27 October –  laid down.
 31 October – Chiyoda carrier conversion completed, recommissioned.
 15 November – ex-SS Scharnhorst commissioned as Shinyo; USS San Jacinto commissioned.
 17 November – USS Bataan commissioned.

 23 November – Argentina Maru carrier conversion completed, commissioned as Kaiyo.
 24 November – USS Wasp commissioned.
 27 November – HMS Glory launched, laid down.
 29 November – USS Hornet commissioned.
 1 December –  laid down.
 4 December – Chūyō sunk in action.
 30 December – HMS Venerable launched.

1944

 1 January – Chitose carrier conversion completed, commissioned.
 19 January – Katsuragi launched.
 24 January – USS Hancock launched.
 31 January – USS Franklin commissioned.
 7 February – USS Ticonderoga launched.
 21 February –  laid down.
 23 February – HMS Vengeance launched.
 24 February – USS Shangri-La launched.
 26 February – USS Bennington launched.
 1 March – ,  laid down.
 7 March – Taihō commissioned.
 23 March –  laid down.
 25 March – First deck landing by a twin engined aircraft, a Mosquito on HMS Indefatigable.
 26 March – HMS Edgar launched.
 15 April – USS Hancock commissioned.
 29 April – USS Bon Homme Richard launched.
 1 May –  laid down.

 3 May – HMS Indefatigable commissioned.
 8 May – USS Ticonderoga commissioned.
 20 May – HM Ships Mars and Warrior launched.
 30 May –  laid down.
 19 June – Shōkaku and Taihō sunk in action.
 20 June – Hiyō sunk in action.
 28 June – USS Randolph launched.
 1 July –  laid down.
 6 July – HMS Theseus launched.
 8 July – HMS Ocean launched;
 10 July –  and  laid down.
 6 August – Unryū commissioned; USS Bennington commissioned.
 10 August – Amagi commissioned.
 18 August – Taiyō sunk in action.
 19 August –  laid down.
 20 August – USS Antietam launched.
 21 August –  laid down.
 28 August – HMS Implacable commissioned.
 7 September –  laid down.
 15 September – USS Shangri-La commissioned; HMS Furious decommissioned, placed in reserve.
 16 September – Unyō sunk in action.
 30 September – HMS Terrible launched.
 2 October – HMS Triumph launched.

 8 October – Shinano launched.
 9 October – USS Randolph commissioned.
 15 October – Katsuragi commissioned.
 19 October – Kasagi launched, never completed and broken up after the war.
 24 October – USS Princeton sunk in action.
 25 October – Chitose, Chiyoda, Zuihō and Zuikaku sunk in action.
 1 November – Aso launched, never completed and broken up after the war.
 2 November – USS Lake Champlain launched.
 16 November – HMS Magnificent launched.
 17 November – Ikoma launched, never completed and broken up after the war; Shinyo sunk in action.
 18 November – USS Valley Forge (CV-45) launched.
 19 November – Shinano commissioned.
 21 November – USS Valley Forge (CV-37) renamed .
 26 November – USS Bon Homme Richard commissioned.
 29 November – Shinano sunk in action.
 December – HMS Argus designated an accommodation ship.
 14 December – USS Boxer launched.

 16 December – HMS Colossus commissioned.
 19 December – Unryū sunk in action.

1945
 15 January – HMS Vengeance commissioned.
 28 January – USS Antietam commissioned.
 27 February – HMS Powerful launched (construction suspended at end of WWII).
 28 February – HMS Majestic launched.
 17 January – HMS Venerable commissioned.
 March – Ryūhō severely damaged by US air attack.
 20 March – USS Midway launched.
 2 April – HMS Glory commissioned.
 9 April – Escort carrier HMS Biter returned to U.S. Navy, immediately transferred to France, recommissioned as Dixmude.
 16 April – USS Boxer commissioned.

 20 April – Ryūhō placed in reserve.
 25 April – Incomplete Graf Zeppelin scuttled by Germany.
 29 April – USS Coral Sea launched.
 5 May – USS Kearsarge launched.
 7 May – Nazi Germany surrenders.
 8 May – USS Crown Point renamed , USS Coral Sea renamed .
 12 May – USS Tarawa launched.
 10 May –  laid down.
 3 June – USS Lake Champlain commissioned.
 7 June – HMS Leviathan launched (ship never completed).
 8 July – USS Princeton and USS Saipan launched.
 24 July – Amagi heavily damaged during air raid.
 25 July – Kaiyo, having been damaged in action the previous day, is deliberately grounded and later refloated.
 28 July – Kaiyo further damaged in action, settles on bottom with 20-degree list to port.
 29 July – Attempts to refloat Kaiyo abandoned.
 29 July – Amagi capsized.
 6 August – U.S. nuclear strike on Hiroshima.
 8 August – HMS Ocean commissioned.
 9 August – Last of caretaker crew leave Kaiyo; U.S. nuclear strike on Nagasaki.
 12 August – USS Reprisal canceled.
 15 August – Japan surrenders; WWII ends.

Post-war 1945–1949

1945

 USS Reprisal (incomplete) launched to clear slipway.
 8 July – USS Valley Forge (CV-45) launched.
 23 August – USS Leyte launched.
 1 September – USS Wright launched.
 5 September – USS Philippine Sea launched.
 10 September – USS Midway commissioned.
 22 September – HMS Hercules launched, laid up for possible future use.
 13 October – USS Oriskany launched; Katsuragi assigned to repatriation duty.
 27 October – USS Franklin D. Roosevelt commissioned.
 18 November – USS Princeton commissioned.
 20 November – Kaiyo decommissioned.
 30 November – Junyō and Ryūhō decommissioned.
 3 December – First landing by a jet-powered aircraft on a carrier, .
 8 December – USS Tarawa commissioned.

1946
 Ryūhō sold for scrap.
 HMS Unicorn decommissioned and placed in reserve;
 January – HMS Audacious renamed .
 9 February – HMS Theseus commissioned.
 March – Graf Zeppelin refloated by the Soviet Union, repaired, and designated "PO-101" (Floating Base Number 101).
 2 March – USS Kearsarge commissioned.
 14 Mar – HMS Warrior commissioned as HMCS Warrior.
 19 March – HMS Eagle launched.
 April – Katsuragi placed on standby.
 2 April – USS Coral Sea launched.
 11 April – USS Leyte commissioned.

 9 May – HMS Triumph commissioned.
 11 May – USS Philippine Sea commissioned.
 1 July – USS Independence and USS Saratoga used during a Bikini Atoll atomic test; both ships were damaged, but survived the test.
 14 July – USS Saipan commissioned.
 21 July – FH Phantom became the first purely jet-powered aircraft to operate from an American aircraft carrier.
 25 July – USS Saratoga sunk by an underwater atomic bomb test at Bikini Island.
 6 August – HMS Colossus renamed Arromanches and loaned to France.
 16 August – Hōshō decommissioned.
 28 August – USS Independence decommissioned.
 September – First helicopter landing aboard a naval escort vessel at sea.
 1 September – Hulk of Kaiyo sold for scrap.
 18 October – USS Ranger decommissioned.
 3 November – USS Valley Forge commissioned.
 8 November – USS Bennington decommissioned, placed in reserve.
 15 November – Katsuragi decommissioned.
 December – HMS Indefatigable decommissioned.

 December – HMS Argus sold for scrap.
 19 December – First Indochina War begins.
 22 December – Katsuragi sold for scrap.

1947
 HMS Indomitable and HMS Formidable placed in reserve.
 HMS Majestic and HMS Terrible purchased by Australia.
 Junyō sold for scrap.
 9 January – USS Essex, USS Yorktown, USS Bon Homme Richard, USS Bunker Hill, and USS Ticonderoga decommissioned, placed in reserve.
 13 January – USS Belleau Wood and USS Cowpens decommissioned, placed in reserve.
 15 January – USS Hornet decommissioned, placed in reserve.
 28 January – USS Ranger sold for scrap.

 9 February – USS Wright commissioned.
 11 February – USS Cabot, USS Monterey, USS Langley, and USS Bataan decommissioned, placed in reserve.
 17 February – USS Lake Champlain, USS Enterprise, USS Franklin, and USS Wasp decommissioned, placed in reserve.
 1 March – USS San Jacinto decommissioned, placed in reserve.
 22 March – USS Intrepid decommissioned, placed in reserve.
 April – HMS Venerable decommissioned, placed in reserve.
 22 April – HMS Centaur launched.
 23 April – USS Lexington decommissioned, placed in reserve.
 30 April – Hōshō sold for scrap.
 6 May – HMS Albion launched.
 9 May – USS Hancock decommissioned, placed in reserve.
 16 August – Graf Zeppelin sunk in target practice by the Soviet Union.
 12 August – USS Oriskany construction suspended.

 1 October – USS Coral Sea commissioned.
 7 November – USS Shangri-La decommissioned, placed in reserve.

1948
 January – HMS Furious sold for scrap.
 25 February – USS Randolph decommissioned, placed in reserve.
 23 March – HMS Warrior returned to UK.
 May – HMS Venerable sold to Netherlands.
 28 May – HMS Venerable recommissioned as HNLMS Karel Doorman.
 20 June – USS Princeton decommissioned, placed in reserve.
 22 June – HMS Bulwark launched.
 24 June – Soviet blockade of Berlin increased tensions in what would become the Cold War between NATO-allied nations and the Warsaw Pact.
 27 October – USS Cabot recommissioned.
 November – HMS Warrior recommissioned, fitted with a rubber deck for trials.

1949
 HMS Unicorn recommissioned as transport carrier.
 Dixmude converted for use as a transport.
 18 April –  laid down.
 4 April – NATO alliance formed.
 23 April – USS United States cancelled.
 21 June – USS Antietam decommissioned, placed in reserve.
 30 June – USS Tarawa decommissioned, placed in reserve.
 2 August – USS Reprisal (incomplete) sold for scrap.

1950–1959

1950
 HMS Indomitable recommissioned; HMS Indefatigable recommissioned as a training ship.
 3 May – HMS Ark Royal launched.
 13 May – USS Bataan recommissioned.
 June – USS Oriskany construction resumed.
 16 June – USS Kearsarge decommissioned, taken in hand for modernisation.
 25 June – Korean War begins.
 28 August – USS Princeton recommissioned.
 15 September – USS Monterey recommissioned.
 25 September – USS Oriskany commissioned.

1951

 Aquila sold for scrap
 Arromanches purchased by France.
 January – USS Langley loaned to France.
 15 January – USS Bon Homme Richard recommissioned.
 16 January – USS Essex recommissioned.
 17 January – USS Antietam recommissioned.
 29 January – USS Independence sunk in weapons tests.
 3 February – USS Tarawa recommissioned.
 20 March – USS Hornet recommissioned.
 10 May – USS Shangri-La recommissioned.
 12 May – USS Hornet decommissioned for conversion to CVA.
 6 June – USS Langley recommissioned as La Fayette.
 31 July –  launched, first small ship designed to carry a helicopter.
 10 September – USS Wasp recommissioned as CVA.
 1 October – HMS Eagle commissioned.

1952
 9 February – USS Intrepid recommissioned.
 15 February – USS Kearsarge recommissioned.
 31 January – USS Ticonderoga recommissioned.
 4 April – USS Ticonderoga decommissioned for conversion to CVA.
 9 April – USS Intrepid decommissioned for conversion to CVA.
 23 April – HMS Powerful sold to Canada, work recommenced.
 14 July –  laid down.
 19 September – USS Lake Champlain recommissioned.
 October – USS Boxer reclassified CVA.
 13 November – HMS Vengeance loaned to Australia, recommissioned as HMAS Vengeance; USS Bennington recommissioned as CVA.
 14 November – USS Shangri-La decommissioned for modernisation.
 16 December –  laid down.

1953
 HMS Formidable sold for scrap.
 HMS Unicorn decommissioned, placed in reserve.
 16 February – HMS Hermes launched.
 20 February – USS Yorktown recommissioned.
 May – HMS Indomitable sold for scrap.
 15 May – USS Bon Homme Richard decommissioned, commenced extensive refit.
 1 July – USS Randolph recommissioned.
 27 July – Korean War fighting ends with the Korean armistice agreement.
 1 September – HMS Centaur launched.
 5 September – USS Belleau Wood loaned to France.

 5 September – USS Belleau Wood recommissioned as Bois Belleau.
 11 September – USS Hornet recommissioned.

1954
 HMS Perseus decommissioned, placed in reserve.
 Mid-1954 – HMS Implacable and HMS Indefatigable decommissioned.
 15 February – USS Hancock recommissioned as CVA.
 9 April – USS Bataan decommissioned, placed in reserve.
 23 April – USS Franklin D. Roosevelt decommissioned for modernisation.
 26 May – HMS Albion commissioned.
 18 June – USS Intrepid recommissioned in reserve.
 1 August – First Indochina War ends.
 2 August –  laid down.
 September – HMS Pioneer decommissioned and sold for scrap;
 11 September – USS Ticonderoga recommissioned after modernisation.

 15 October – USS Intrepid returned to full commission.
 4 November – HMS Bulwark commissioned.
 December – HMS Illustrious decommissioned.
 11 December – USS Forrestal launched.

1955
 10 January – USS Shangri-La recommissioned.
 21 January – USS Cabot decommissioned, placed in reserve.
 25 February –  commissioned, incorporating an angled flight deck, two steam catapults, and a mirror landing system.
 6 April – USS Franklin D. Roosevelt recommissioned with angled flight deck, steam catapult and hurricane bow.
 14 May – Warsaw Pact formed.
 July – USS Midway decommissioned for modernisation.
 1 July –  laid down.
 13 August – HMS Vengeance returned to UK.
 15 August – USS Lexington recommissioned as CVA.
 6 September – USS Bon Homme Richard recommissioned.
 29 September – USS Forrestal commissioned.
 8 October – USS Saratoga launched.
 25 October – HMAS Vengeance decommissioned.
 26 October – HMS Majestic christened as HMAS Majestic.

 November – HMS Implacable sold for scrap.
 1 November – Clemenceau (France) laid down.
 15 November – USS Boxer reclassified as CVS.

1956
 HMS Indefatigable sold for scrap.
 HMS Glory decommissioned, placed in reserve.
 16 January – USS Monterey decommissioned, placed in reserve.
 15 March – USS Wright decommissioned, placed in reserve.
 13 April – USS Hancock decommissioned.
 14 April – USS Saratoga commissioned.
 26 September – USS Ranger launched.
 29 October – Suez Crisis begins.
 3 November – HMS Illustrious sold for scrap.
 15 November – USS Hancock recommissioned.

 14 December – HMS Vengeance sold to Brazil.
 27 December –  laid down.

1957
 HMS Theseus decommissioned, placed in reserve.
 January – HMS Hercules sold to India, construction restarted.
 2 January – USS Oriskany decommissioned, started modernisation.
 15 February – Foch (France) laid down.
 24 May – USS Coral Sea decommissioned for modernisation.
 14 June – HMCS Magnificent returned to UK and placed in reserve as HMS Magnificent.

 10 August – USS Ranger commissioned.
 14 September –  laid down.
 30 September – USS Midway recommissioned.
 3 October – USS Saipan decommissioned, placed in reserve.
 5 December – HMS Ocean decommissioned, placed in reserve.
 21 December – Clemenceau launched.

1958
 HMS Perseus and HMS Ocean sold for scrap.
 February – HMS Warrior decommissioned.
 4 February –  laid down.
 30 May – HMAS Sydney decommissioned, held in reserve.
 6 June – USS Independence launched.
 1 July – USS Enterprise (Yorktown class) sold for scrap.
 4 November – Ex-HMS Warrior sold to Argentina.
 28 December – USS Philippine Sea decommissioned, placed in reserve.

1959

 10 January – USS Independence commissioned.
 26 January – Ex-HMS Warrior commissioned as ARA Independencia.
 30 January – USS Boxer reclassified LPH.
 2 March – USS Princeton reclassified LPH.
 7 March – USS Oriskany recommissioned.
 15 May – USS Leyte decommissioned, placed in reserve.
 June – HMS Unicorn sold for scrap.
 1 November – USS Cowpens sold for scrap.
 18 November – HMS Hermes commissioned.

1960–1969

1960

 Dixmude hulked as an accommodation ship.
 HMS Ocean and HMS Theseus sold for scrap.
 25 January – USS Coral Sea recommissioned.
 May – USS Tarawa decommissioned, placed in reserve.
 21 May – USS Kitty Hawk launched.
 28 July – Foch launched.
 September – Bois Belleau returned to US Navy.
 24 September – USS Enterprise launched.
 1 October – Bois Belleau struck.
 8 October – USS Constellation launched.
 21 November – USS Belleau Wood sold for scrap.
 6 December – Ex-HMS Vengeance recommissioned as NAeL Minas Gerais.

1961

 9 January –  laid down.
 29 April – USS Kitty Hawk commissioned.
 May – USS Bataan sold for scrap.
 1 July – USS Valley Forge reclassified LPH.
 27 October – USS Constellation commissioned.
 22 November – Clemenceau commissioned.
 25 November – USS Enterprise commissioned; first nuclear-powered aircraft carrier.

1962
 7 March – HMAS Sydney recommissioned as fast troop carrier.
 15 March – USS Wright conversion to command and control ship started.
 Mid 1962 – HMS Albion designated as commando carrier.
 August – Indonesia plans invasion of West New Guinea; war plans include sinking of Dutch carrier Karel Doorman using Soviet-supplied bombers with anti-ship missiles, but ceasefire ended the threat.

1963
 7 January – USS Antietam decommissioned, placed in reserve.
 15 July – Foch commissioned.
 March – La Fayette (USS Langley) returned to USN.
 March – USS Saipan conversion to communications command ship started.
 11 May – USS Wright recommissioned as command and control ship.

1964
 19 February – USS Langley sold for scrap.
 1 February – USS America launched.
 2 August – Gulf of Tonkin Incident led U.S. to greatly increase its overt role in the Vietnam War.
 1 September – USS Saipan reclassified as Major Communications Relay Ship (AGMR).
 22 October –  laid down.

1965

 23 January – USS America commissioned.
 8 April – USS Saipan renamed .
 July – HMS Magnificent sold for scrap.

1966
 HMS Centaur designated as depot ship.
 Béarn decommissioned.
 British 1966 Defence White Paper cancels defense projects such as CVA-01 and begins plans for phased end to UK carrier aviation.
 Dixmude returned to U.S. Navy, sunk as target.
 15 February – USS Midway decommissioned for further modernisation.
 2 May – USS Lake Champlain decommissioned.
 27 July – USS Franklin sold for scrap.
 27 August – USS Arlington recommissioned as communication relay ship.

1967

 HMS Victorious decommissioned for re-fit, subsequently damaged in a minor fire leading to decision to scrap.
 30 August – USS Cabot loaned to Spain, recommissioned as Dédalo.
 31 March – Béarn sold for scrap.
 27 May – USS John F. Kennedy launched.

1968
 Arromanches redesignated as a helicopter carrier.
 26 April – HNLMS Karel Doorman decommissioned, placed in reserve, end of Dutch carrier aviation.
 22 June –  laid down
 July – USS Franklin D. Roosevelt decommissioned for modernisation.
 7 September – USS John F. Kennedy commissioned.
 3 October – USS Tarawa sold for scrap.
 15 October – HNLMS Karel Doorman sold to Argentina.

1969
 1 January – USS Lexington reclassified as a training carrier (CVT).
 13 February – USS Randolph decommissioned, placed in reserve.
 12 March – Ex-HNLMS Karel Doorman recommissioned as ARA Veinticinco de Mayo.
 26 May – USS Franklin D. Roosevelt recommissioned.
 30 June – USS Essex decommissioned.
 July – HMS Victorious sold for scrap.
 1 December – USS Boxer decommissioned; USS Philippine Sea struck.

1970–1979

1970
 ARA Independencia decommissioned, placed in reserve.
 14 January – USS Arlington decommissioned.
 15 January – USS Bennington decommissioned, placed in reserve; USS Valley Forge decommissioned.
 30 January – USS Princeton decommissioned.
 31 January – USS Midway recommissioned.
 13 February – USS Kearsarge decommissioned, placed in reserve.
 27 May – USS Wright decommissioned, placed in reserve.
 26 June – USS Hornet decommissioned, placed in reserve.
 27 June – USS Yorktown decommissioned.
 3 July – HMCS Bonaventure decommissioned.
 15 August –  laid down.
 September – Soviet aircraft carrier Kiev laid down.
 September – USS Leyte sold for scrap.

1971
 HMS Centaur decommissioned.
 March – HMCS Bonaventure sold for scrap.
 13 March – USS Boxer sold for scrap.
 17 March – ARA Independencia sold for scrap.
 23 March – USS Philippine Sea sold for scrap.
 May – USS Monterey and USS Princeton sold for scrap.
 2 July – USS Bon Homme Richard decommissioned, placed in reserve.
 30 July – USS Shangri-La decommissioned, placed in reserve.
 29 October – USS Valley Forge sold for scrap.
 3 December – Indo-Pakistani War of 1971 begins. Indian carrier  carries out airstrikes against land and naval targets; Pakistani submarine PNS Ghazi sent to hunt the Vikrant, but sinks under mysterious circumstances.
 15 December – USS San Jacinto sold for scrap.

1972

 HMS Centaur sold for scrap.
 HMS Albion decommissioned and sold for scrap.
 26 January – HMS Eagle decommissioned.
 28 April – USS Lake Champlain sold for scrap.
 13 May – USS Nimitz launched.
 1 July – USS Wasp decommissioned.
 5 December – Loan of Dédalo (ex-) to Spain converted to sale.
 December – Kiev launched, Minsk laid down.

1973
 USS Bunker Hill sold for scrap.
 27 January – Paris Peace Accords; U.S. forces withdraw from the Vietnam War.
 21 May – USS Wasp sold for scrap.
 20 July –  laid down.
 1 September – USS Ticonderoga decommissioned.
 12 November – HMAS Sydney decommissioned.

1974
 22 January – Arromanches decommissioned.
 28 February – USS Antietam sold for scrap.
 1 March – USS Kearsarge sold for scrap.
 15 March – USS Intrepid decommissioned.

1975

 HMS Triumph decommissioned, placed in reserve.
 1 April – USS Randolph sold for scrap.
 May – Kiev commissioned.
 3 May – USS Nimitz commissioned.
 1 June – USS Essex sold for scrap.
 1 September – USS Ticonderoga sold for scrap.
 30 September – Minsk launched; Novorossiysk laid down.
 11 October – USS Dwight D. Eisenhower launched;  laid down.
 13 October – USS Yorktown preserved as museum ship.
 28 October – HMAS Sydney sold for scrap.

1976
 30 January – USS Hancock decommissioned.
 March – HMS Bulwark decommissioned, placed in reserve.
 1 June – USS Arlington sold for scrap.
 1 September – USS Hancock sold for scrap.
 September STOVL Harriers equip Spanish aircraft carrier Dédalo, returning her to fixed-wing carrier operations; first STOVL aircraft carrier.
 30 September – USS Oriskany decommissioned, placed in reserve.
 7 October –  laid down.

1977
 3 May – HMS Invincible launched.
 30 September – USS Franklin D. Roosevelt decommissioned.
 18 October – USS Dwight D. Eisenhower commissioned.

1978

 Arromanches sold for scrap.
 1 April – USS Franklin D. Roosevelt sold for scrap.
 27 September – Minsk commissioned.
 17 February – Baku laid down.
 October – HMS Eagle sold for scrap.
 1 December – HMS Illustrious launched.
 14 December –  (Invincible class) laid down.
 26 December – Novorossiysk launched.

1979
 February – HMS Ark Royal (Audacious class) decommissioned; end of conventional Catapult-Assisted Take-Off But Arrested Recovery (CATOBAR) carrier operations for the UK.
 23 February – HMS Bulwark recommissioned.
 8 October – Príncipe de Asturias laid down.

1980–1989

1980

 HMS Bulwark placed in reserve.
 15 March – USS Carl Vinson launched.
 11 July – HMS Invincible commissioned; first purpose-built STOVL carrier, first ship to include a ski-jump ramp.
 1 August – USS Wright sold for scrap.
 22 September – HMS Ark Royal (Audacious class) sold for scrap.

1981
 26 March –  laid down.
 27 March – HMS Bulwark decommissioned.
 10 April – HMS Bulwark sold for scrap.
 9 May – First carrier fitted with a ski jump, .
 2 June – HMS Ark Royal launched.
 13 October –  laid down.
 9 December – HMS Triumph sold for scrap.

1982

 25 February – Australian government announces its intention to purchase HMS Invincible and rename it HMAS Australia.
 13 March – USS Carl Vinson commissioned.
 19 March – Argentina invades South Georgia, launching the Falklands War; this war provides the impetus to slow the drawdown of the Royal Navy, including carrier aviation; deal to sell HMS Invincible to Australia cancelled.
 23 March – USS Intrepid struck, preserved as a museum ship.
 1 April – Baku launched.
 1 May – Argentine carrier  detects and attempts airstrike against British fleet, but is unable to launch due to unfavorable winds.
 2 May – Argentine cruiser  sunk by British submarine; carrier Veinticinco de Mayo withdraws to safe port for the duration of the war.
 22 May – Príncipe de Asturias launched.
 30 May – HMAS Melbourne decommissioned.
 14 June – Argentine land forces in the Falkland Islands surrender, ending the conflict.
 20 June – HMS Illustrious commissioned.
 5 July – USS Shangri-La struck.
 September – Novorossiysk commissioned.

1983
 22 February –  laid down.
 4 June – Giuseppe Garibaldi launched.

1984
 12 April – HMS Hermes decommissioned, placed in maintained reserve.
 27 October – USS Theodore Roosevelt launched.
 3 November –  laid down.

1985

 ARA Veinticinco de Mayo inoperable, laid up for possible modernisation.
 HMAS Melbourne sold for scrap.
 30 September – Giuseppe Garibaldi commissioned as helicopter anti-submarine warfare carrier.
 1 November – HMS Ark Royal commissioned.
 5 December – Leonid Brezhnev launched.
 10 December –  laid down.

1986
 April – HMS Hermes sold to India.
 15 April – U.S. 1986 Bombing of Libya by carrier- and land-based aircraft.
 25 August –  laid down.
 25 October – USS Theodore Roosevelt commissioned.

1987
 11 December – Baku commissioned.

1988
 13 February – USS Abraham Lincoln launched.
 30 May – Príncipe de Asturias commissioned.
 9 August – USS Shangri-La sold for scrap.
 October – Leonid Brezhnev renamed .
 December –  laid down.
 4 December – Riga launched.

1989

 Giuseppe Garibaldi takes on Harrier aircraft, initiating Italian fixed-wing carrier operations.
 INS Vikrant ends CATOBAR operations and is converted with ski jump to all-STOVL operations.
 14 April –  laid down; first non-U.S. nuclear aircraft carrier.
 25 July – USS Hornet struck, preserved as a museum ship; USS Oriskany struck to be preserved as a museum ship or scrapped.
 5 August – Dédalo decommissioned.
 20 September – USS Bon Homme Richard and USS Bennington struck.
 11 November – USS Abraham Lincoln commissioned.

1990–1999

1990
 Riga renamed Varyag.
 30 April – USS Coral Sea decommissioned.
 21 July – USS George Washington launched.
 2 August – Gulf War begins with Iraq invading Kuwait.
 4 October – Tbilisi renamed Admiral Kuznetsov.

1991

 Baku renamed Admiral Gorshkov.
 21 January – Admiral Kuznetsov commissioned.
 28 February – Gulf War ends with ceasefire.
 13 March –  laid down.
 1 November – Ulyanovsk cancelled at 40% complete.
 8 November – USS Lexington decommissioned.
 25 December – Soviet Union dissolves, Cold War ends

1992
 Construction of Varyag stopped, transferred to the Ukraine.
 4 February – Ulyanovsk scrapped; USS Bon Homme Richard sold for scrap.
 11 April – USS Midway decommissioned, preserved as a museum ship.
 15 June – USS Lexington donated as a museum ship.
 4 July – USS George Washington commissioned.
 September – Novorossiysk laid up in reserve.

1993
 7 May – USS Coral Sea sold for scrap.
 30 June – Kiev, Minsk and Novorossiysk decommissioned.
 10 July – USS Ranger decommissioned, on donation hold as of 2004.
 11 September – USS Forrestal decommissioned, on donation hold.
 13 November – USS John C. Stennis launched.
 29 November –  laid down.

1994
 1 December – USS Bennington sold for scrap.
 7 May – Charles de Gaulle launched.
 12 July – HTMS Chakri Naruebet laid down.
 20 August – USS Saratoga decommissioned.

1995

 1 August – Novorossiysk and Minsk sold for scrap, Minsk not scrapped.
 9 September – USS Oriskany sold for scrap, not scrapped.
 10 October – HMS Ocean launched.
 9 December – USS John C. Stennis commissioned.

1996
 20 January – HTMS Chakri Naruebet launched.
 9 August – USS America decommissioned.
 14 September – USS Harry S. Truman launched.

1997

 ARA Veinticinco de Mayo decommissioned.
 31 January – INS Vikrant (R11) decommissioned, to be converted to a museum ship at Mumbai.
 27 March – HTMS Chakri Naruebet commissioned.
 30 July – USS Oriskany repossessed by the USN due to default by scrapping contractor.
 1 October – Clemenceau decommissioned.

1998

 12 February –  laid down.
 April – Varyag sold to China.
 August – Minsk towed to China for use in an amusement park.
 30 September – USS Independence decommissioned.
 25 July – USS Harry S. Truman commissioned.

1999
 Varyag departed Ukraine under tow, refused passage through Bosporus Strait, stationed near the straits for three years.
 January – ARA Veinticinco de Mayo sold for scrap.

2000–2009
2000

 1 January – USS Saratoga placed on donation hold.
 October – Scrapping of Dédalo commenced.
 15 November – Foch decommissioned, and recommissioned as NAe São Paulo.

2001

 10 March – USS Ronald Reagan launched.
 18 May – Charles de Gaulle commissioned.
 17 July – Cavour laid down.
 7 October – War in Afghanistan begins.
 16 October – NAeL Minas Gerais decommissioned.

2002
 Varyag allowed passage through Bosporus Strait, arrived in Dalian Shipyard in northern China.

2003
 20 March – US-led 2003 invasion of Iraq launched.
 12 July – USS Ronald Reagan commissioned.
 7 August – USS Constellation decommissioned.
 6 September –  laid down.
 11 September – USS Forrestal designated for disposal.
 2 December – USS Constellation stricken.

2004
 NAeL Minas Gerais sold for scrap.
 20 January – Admiral Gorshkov sold to India; being refurbished and renamed .
 April – USS Independence nominated to be sunk as artificial reef.
 20 July – Cavour launched.

2005
 11 April –  steel plate cutting started.
 19 April – USS America towed to sea for live firing tests.
 May – Juan Carlos I laid down.
 14 May – USS America scuttled.
 3 August – HMS Invincible decommissioned, placed in reserve until 2010.

2006
 17 May – USS Oriskany sunk as an artificial reef.
 31 May – Minsk sold at auction, disposition unknown.
 7 October – USS George H. W. Bush launched.

2007
 1 August – USS John F. Kennedy decommissioned, placed in reserve.

2008

 February – USS Forrestal prepared to be sunk as a reef; USS Independence and USS Constellation scheduled to be scrapped within five years.
 10 March – Juan Carlos I launched.
 27 March – Cavour commissioned.

2009
 10 January – USS George H. W. Bush commissioned; final ship of the Nimitz class.
 28 February – INS Vikrant keel laid
 12 May – USS Kitty Hawk decommissioned, placed in reserve.
 7 July – First steel cut for 
 13 November –  laid down

2010–2019

2010

 30 September – Juan Carlos I commissioned

2011
 11 Mar –  decommissioned
 26 May – First steel cut for 
 10 August – Ex-Varyag completed, began sea trials for the PLAN.

2012

 8 June – (ex-Admiral Gorshkov) commenced sea trials
 25 September – Ex-Varyag commissioned as Chinese aircraft carrier Liaoning
 10 October – India and Russia announce delay in handover of INS Vikramaditya delayed twelve months until fourth quarter 2013
 1 December – USS Enterprise decommissioned

2013
 6 February – Príncipe de Asturias (R-11) decommissioned.
 12 August –  launched
 9 November –  launched.
 16 November –  (ex-Admiral Gorshkov) re-commissioned.

2014

 17 July –  launched.
 28 August –  decommissioned
 11 Oct –  commissioned. First of a new class of amphibious assault ships.
 22 November –  (ex-HMS Hercules) scrapped
 28 November –  commissioned into the Australian Navy. First Australian helicopter carrier.

2015
 25 March – JS Izumo commissioned into the Japanese Navy as third serving helicopter carrier
 31 March –   decommissioned.
 4 December – HMAS Adelaide (L01) commissioned into the Australian Navy. Second Australian helicopter carrier.

2016
 2 June – ENS Gamal Abdel Nasser commissioned into the Egyptian Navy. First aircraft carrier operated by an African country.
16 September – ENS Anwar El Sadat commissioned into the Egyptian Navy. Second Egyptian helicopter carrier.

2017
14 February – Brazilian aircraft carrier São Paulo (A12) (Ex-French aircraft carrier Foch (R99)) retires from service.
6 March –  (ex-) decommissioned from the Indian Navy.
22 March – JS Kaga commissioned into the Japanese Navy as fourth serving helicopter carrier.
 8 April –  begins sea trials.
26 April – Type 001A aircraft carrier, later type 002 Shandong, launched.
26 June –  begins sea trials.
24 August –  first steel cut.
 8 September –  Christened
 7 December –  commissioned
21 December –  launched

2018
 29 June 2018 – PHM Atlântico (A-140) (ex-) commissioned to Brazilian Navy.

2019
25 September – Chinese landing helicopter dock Hainan launched, the first of the new class Type 075
10 December –  commissioned.
17 December – Type 002 commissioned as Chinese aircraft carrier Shandong, the third and likely final

2020–present
2020
 15 July –  commissioned, the second and last Flight 0  helicopter carrier before production of the Flight 1 amphibious assault variant begins

2021
 23 April – Chinese landing helicopter dock Hainan commissioned
 28 June –  commissioned
 4 August –  begins sea trials after delays
 13 August – Italian landing helicopter dock Trieste begins sea trials
 26 December – Chinese landing helicopter dock Guangxi commissioned, the second Type 075 landing helicopter dock

2022
 27 February – TCG Anadolu begins sea trials
 17 June – Chinese Type 003 aircraft carrier Fujian launched
  2 September -  is commissioned into the Indian Navy.

See also 
 Fleet of the Royal Canadian Navy
 List of active French Navy ships
 List of active Italian Navy ships
 List of active Spanish Navy ships
 List of aircraft carrier classes of the United States Navy
 List of aircraft carriers
 List of aircraft carriers by configuration
 List of aircraft carriers by country
 List of aircraft carriers in service
 List of aircraft carriers of Germany
 List of aircraft carriers of Russia and the Soviet Union
 List of aircraft carriers of the Royal Navy
 List of aircraft carriers of the United States Navy
 List of amphibious warfare ships
 List of escort carriers of the Royal Navy
 List of seaplane carriers of the Royal Navy
 List of ships of the Imperial Japanese Navy
 List of sunken aircraft carriers
 List of United States Navy escort aircraft carriers
 People's Liberation Army Navy Surface Force 
 Ships of the Indian Navy
 Timeline of aircraft carriers of the United States Navy

Footnotes

For most carriers, the dates listed here are those when the carrier was laid down, launched, commissioned, decommissioned and disposed of. If the carrier was a conversion from another ship, then the first date listed is when she was taken in hand to be converted; however, if a carrier was subsequently redesignated, its history is followed until disposal. The first time a ship is named in the list, it is linked to the relevant page within Wikipedia; if the ship was renamed, the first instance of the new name is also linked. Additionally, key relevant historical dates are interspersed with the ship-related dates to provide context.

For the purposes of this timeline, an aircraft carrier is a commissioned naval ship with at least one permanent flush deck designed for the launch and recovery of fixed-wing aircraft. This timeline does not include ships with temporary landing or take-off platforms, vessels designed for helicopter operations, marine assault ships of various designs, catapult ships, WWII escort carriers, merchant aircraft carriers, CAM ships, nor seaplane carriers and tenders.

The timeline is mainly divided into decades, the exceptions being the two World Wars and the interwar period, which are each treated as separate blocks. For the purposes of this list, the First World War is considered to have started on 28 June 1914 and ended 11 November 1918, while the Second World War is considered to have started on 1 September 1939 and ended 14 August 1945.

 The actual text of the message from the First Lord of the Admiralty to the Wright Brothers, dated 7 March 1907, taken from The Old Flying Days by Charles Cyril Turner, p. 293, was:

Citations

uss kitty hawk citation 1980–1981

References

Books

Articles

Web Sites
 
 
 
  
 
 
 
 
 
 
 
 
 
 
 
 
 
 
 
 
 
 
 USS Cabot (CVL-28)
 
 
 "CV FOCH (R 99)", "CV CLEMENCEAU (R 98)", Carriers, French Fleet Air Arm, Retrieved 24 September 2008
 "HMAS Melbourne (II)", "HMAS Sydney (III)", "HMAS Vengeance", HMA Ship Histories, Sea Power Centre, Royal Australian Navy official web site, Retrieved 13 September 2008
 "Admiral Flota Sovetskogo Soyuza Kuznetsov", "Baku", "Kiev", "Kiev Class Overview", "Minsk","Novorossiysk", Maritime Quest, maritimequest.com, Retrieved 15 October 2008
 "Audacious Class Fleet Aircraft Carriers", "Colossus Class Light Fleet Aircraft Carriers", The Royal Navy Postwar, Retrieved 1 November 2008 (archived links)

Other
 "Securing Britain in an Age of Uncertainty: The Strategic Defence and Security Review", HM Government (2010), pp. 75, Retrieved 16 February 2011

External links 
 Royal Navy Escort Carriers
 World Aircraft Carriers List, Haze Gray & Underway

Aircraft carrier service, Timeline for
Lists of aircraft carriers